Silent So Long is the second studio album by industrial rock band Emigrate. It was released on November 14, 2014 in Europe and December 9, 2014 in the United States via Vertigo/Capitol and Spinefarm/Universal Music. Recording session took place at Studio Engine 55 and at Funkhaus Studio in Berlin, with vocals for "Hypothetical" recorded at Poolhouse in Los Angeles. It features guest appearances from Frank Dellé of Seeed, Jonathan Davis, Lemmy, Margaux Bossieux, Marilyn Manson and Peaches.

Frontman Richard Kruspe's equipment included ESP Guitars, Mesa Boogie Rectifier amps, Pro Tools, Apple Logic, Jim Dunlop pedals, strings and guitar picks, TC Electronic effects and pedals, EMG guitar pickups, and Native Instruments plug-ins.

Track listing

Personnel

Richard Kruspe – lyrics, guitars, vocals, keyboards, electro sequencer
Terry Matlin – lyrics
Thomas Borman – lyrics
Margaux Bossieux – lyrics, backing vocals, featured artist (track 9)
Sascha Moser – drum and guitar editing
Mikko Sirén – drums
Arnaud Giroux – bass, vocal recording and production, cover design
Olsen Involtini – additional guitars, vocal recording and production, drum recording and engineering
Florian Ammon – vocal recording (track 4)
Ulf Kruckenberg – drum recording and engineering
Ben Grosse – mixing
Tom Baker – mastering
Erik Laser – management
Birgit Fordyce – management
Stefan Mehnert – management
Klaus Merz – photography
Frank Dellé – featured artist (track 1)
Merrill Beth Nisker – featured artist (track 2)
Ian Fraser Kilmister – featured artist (track 3)
Brian Hugh Warner – featured artist (track 4)
Jonathan Davis – featured artist (track 11)

Charts

References

External links

2014 albums
Emigrate (band) albums